Daniel Peter Gordon Jr. (April 12, 1969 – March 25, 2017) was an American politician and construction contractor. Gordon was a Libertarian member of the Rhode Island House of Representatives. Gordon was elected as a Republican Representative in November 2010 for the 71st District, defeating Democratic candidate George S. Alzaibak.

In September 2011 he was expelled from the Republican caucus for allegedly making derogatory comments about other Republicans online. Gordon changed his party affiliation from Republican to Libertarian, becoming the only Libertarian Party member in any United States legislature during that time.

Background
Gordon was born in Bristol, Pennsylvania. He served in the United States Marine Corps.

Rhode Island House of Representatives

2010 Election
Gordon decided to run as a Republican for Rhode Island's 71st house district, based in Jamestown, Portsmouth, and Little Compton; when Republican State Representative John J. Loughlin, Jr. retired from that position to run for Rhode Island's 1st congressional district, which had been vacated by retiring Democrat U.S. Congressman Patrick J. Kennedy.

Gordon became the Republican nominee and narrowly defeated Democratic nominee George Alzaibak 50.4–49.6%, a difference of just 47 votes.

Controversies
In March 2011, he made a controversial comment in an online article reporting that Tiverton High School started the school's first Gay-Straight Alliance.

2012 Election
Gordon ran for re-election in the November 6, 2012 election as a Libertarian, but failed to get enough signatures to get on the ballot. He ran as a write-in candidate and lost the election to Democrat Dennis Canario by a wide margin, thus leaving no Libertarians in any state legislature in the country.

Death
Gordon died on March 25, 2017.

References

1969 births
2017 deaths
Republican Party members of the Rhode Island House of Representatives
People from Bristol, Pennsylvania
Military personnel from Pennsylvania
Rhode Island Libertarians
Libertarian Party (United States) officeholders